Anita Douthat (born 1950) is an American photographer.

Biography 
Douthat received a bachelor of science from the Institute of Design at the Illinois Institute of Technology (Chicago, IL) in 1972 and a master of fine arts from the University of New Mexico (Albuquerque, NM) in 1986.

Her photograms have been included in exhibitions at the Cincinnati Art Museum (Cincinnati, OH); Indianapolis Art Center (Indianapolis, IN); Ross Art Museum at Ohio Wesleyan University (Delaware, OH); and the Weston Art Gallery in the Aronoff Center for the Arts (Cincinnati, OH).

Her work is included in the collections of the Cincinnati Art Museum (Cincinnati, OH); Museum of Fine Arts (Houston, TX); Columbus Museum of Art (Columbus, OH); and University of New Mexico Art Museum (Albuquerque, NM).

She has been the recipient of grants from the National Endowment for the Arts, the New England Foundation for the Arts, and the Kentucky Foundation for Women.

From 1985–1992, she was curator of the Photographic Resource Center at Boston University and is currently associate director of the Carl Solway Gallery (Cincinnati, OH).

Born in Cincinnati, she currently resides in Alexandria, Kentucky.

Artistic process 

Douthat makes large photograms. She places found objects, chosen for their transparent or opaque qualities, atop photosensitive paper and lets the light burn through to create silhouette-like imagery. Later, the paper is chemically gold-toned — it gets a purplish color — and fixed for permanence. Her Alterations series is of life size images of women's apparel, including wedding dresses.

Awards 
Douthat has received awards and grants for her work from the following bodies,
 New England Foundation for the Arts
 MacDowell Colony, Peterborough, NH
 National Endowment for the Arts, Visual Artists Fellowship in Photography
 Kentucky Foundation for Women

Solo exhibitions

 1992: In Praise of Shadows, Houston Center for Photography
 1993: Vanishing Act, Robert C. May Gallery of Photography, University of KY, Lexington
 1994: Defying Gravity, Carnegie Arts Center, Covington, KY
 2007: With a Trace, Indianapolis Art Center, IN
 2014: Under the Sun, Westin Art Gallery, Aronoff Center, Cincinnati, OH.

Selected group shows
 2015: After the Moment: Reflections on Robert Mapplethorpe, Contemporary Art Center, Cincinnati, OH.
 2015: Photography Since the Millennium, Carnegie Center for Art & History, New Albany, IN

References

External links

1950 births
Living people
American women artists
Artists from Cincinnati
Illinois Institute of Technology alumni
University of New Mexico alumni
21st-century American women